Rhiju Das (born 1978 in Houston, Texas) is a computational biochemist and an associate professor of biochemistry and physics at Stanford University.
Research in his lab seeks a predictive understanding of how RNA molecules and their complexes form molecular machines fundamental to life.

Education 

Das was trained as a physicist before switching to biochemistry. His undergraduate education was at Harvard, in physics, followed by master's research as a Marshall scholar at Cambridge University and University College London in experimental cosmology and molecular phylogenetics. He completed his Ph.D. in physics at Stanford University, supervised by Sebastian Doniach and Daniel Herschlag.

Career 

Das was a Damon Runyon postdoctoral fellow working on protein structure prediction with David Baker at the University of Washington. He joined Stanford’s Biochemistry department in 2009 and was promoted with tenure in 2016. He was selected to be a Howard Hughes investigator in 2021.

Research 

Das develops methods to simulate and computationally design RNA molecules as well as experimental methods to infer RNA structure from multidimensional chemical mapping measurements. Integrating these efforts, Das directs the EteRNA massive open laboratory, which integrates an internet-scale videogame with massively parallel experimental and machine learning. The project aims to empower citizen scientists to invent medicine.

In 2020, Das and his staff used the EteRNA platform to investigate potentially shelf-stable RNA vaccines for COVID-19.  An interview with Das about this work was featured in an episode of Nova, "Decoding COVID-19", in May 2020.

References

American biochemists
Living people
1978 births
Stanford University faculty
Stanford University alumni
Harvard University alumni
Marshall Scholars